The 1961 Colorado Buffaloes football team represented the University of Colorado at Boulder as a member of the Big Eight Conference during the 1961 NCAA University Division football season. Led by third-year head coach Sonny Grandelius, Colorado finished the regular season at 9–1 (7–0 in Big 8), and played their home games on campus at Folsom Field in Boulder, Colorado.

As in the previous year, Colorado defeated both Oklahoma and Nebraska; they did not defeat both in the same season again for 28 years. The Buffaloes won their first Big Eight title and were invited to the Orange Bowl in Miami, but lost 25–7 to fourth-ranked LSU on New Year's Day.

After the season, in March 1962, Grandelius was fired by the university regents for recruiting violations, primarily due to the operation of a slush fund for players and families. Ten days later, alumni director Bud Davis was hired as the interim head coach; he had no collegiate coaching experience, just five years as a high school head coach. A month later, the NCAA put the CU football program on probation for two years; because the university began the investigation and took action, the penalties were relatively light.

Schedule

Coaching staff
 Bob Ghilotti (ends)
  Chuck Boerio (LB)
 Buck Nystrom (line) 
 Hohn Polonchek (assistant head coach)

References

External links
 Sports-Reference – 1961 Colorado Buffaloes

Colorado
Colorado Buffaloes football seasons
Big Eight Conference football champion seasons
Colorado Buffaloes football